Satisfy My Soul is the seventh solo studio album by the English singer-songwriter Paul Carrack, then a member of the supergroup Mike + The Mechanics. It was originally released in 2000 on Carrack's own Carrack-UK label.

Mike Rutherford of Mike + The Mechanics contributes to the album as a songwriter, as does Carrack's former Squeeze bandmate Chris Difford.  Carrack produced the album himself, and played the majority of the instruments.  The record peaked at #63 on the UK album charts.

Reception

AllMusic's William Cooper calls Satisfy My Soul "another collection of melodic pop songs" from "an engaging, solid performer."  Cooper notes that "though some of the material is weak, (Carrack's) distinctive vocal gifts make even the most mediocre song worth hearing."

Track listing

Personnel 
Credits are adapted from the album's liner notes.
 Paul Carrack – vocals, keyboards, guitars, bass, drums
 Ian Thomas – drums (1, 8, 10, 11)
 Lee Russell – drum loops (3)
 Andy Newmark – drums (5, 9)
 Steve Beighton – saxophones
 David Crichton – strings
 Lindsay Dracass – backing vocals (2)

Production 
 Peter Van Hooke – executive producer 
 Paul Carrack – producer, engineer 
 Graham Bonnett – additional engineer 
 Nigel Bates – mixing, mastering, technical support
 Benedict Fenner – mastering
 Bill Smith Studio – art direction, design 
 Michele Turriani – photography

References

External links

2000 albums
Paul Carrack albums